Romano Mattè (born 17 January 1939) is an Italian football educator who led the Mali national team from 2000 to 2001. Besides Italy, he managed in Indonesia and Mali.

Career

Indonesia
Mattè was born in Italy. He was called to Indonesia to direct the Under-18, Under-21, and pre-Olympic selections in the 1990s on a deal between Sampdoria and the Football Association of Indonesia, Matte was in charge of the Garuda for the 1995 Southeast Asian Games, calling up youngsters such as Kurniawan Dwi Yulianto and Kurnia Sandy who later went to Sampdoria through Matte. Assisted by Danurwindo as well as Harry Tjong, the retiree was said to have been paid around 17 million Indonesian rupiahs each month.  Recalling his experience there, he admired the locals respect for him and their humility.

Mali
Introduced as Mali Mali national team coach in summer 2000, the Italian stated that football there used to be intertwined with superstition and that clubs had their own witch doctors, appreciating the passion for the sport in the country as well. However, his time there ended early in 2001 and he watched Les Aigles get the better of South Africa 2–0 before going to Italy.

References

External links
 ROMANO MATTE', IRPINIA E NOSTALGIA
 ROMANO MATTE' E I RADIOHEAD

Living people
1939 births
Italian football managers
U.S.D. 1913 Seregno Calcio managers
Treviso F.B.C. 1993 managers
U.S. Salernitana 1919 managers
A.C. Cuneo 1905 managers
Teramo Calcio managers
Ternana Calcio managers
A.C.N. Siena 1904 managers
Indonesia national football team managers
Piacenza Calcio 1919 managers
Calcio Padova managers
Benevento Calcio managers
U.S. Alessandria Calcio 1912 managers
U.S. Livorno 1915 managers
Mali national football team managers
Italian expatriate football managers
Italian expatriate sportspeople in Indonesia
Expatriate football managers in Indonesia
Italian expatriate sportspeople in Mali
Expatriate football managers in Mali
21st-century Malian people
A.C.D. Sant'Angelo 1907 managers